A book hand was any of several stylized handwriting scripts used during ancient and medieval times. It was intended for legibility and often used in transcribing official documents (prior to the development of printing and similar technologies).

In palaeography and calligraphy, the term hand is still used to refer to a named style of writing, such as the chancery hand.

See also

Bastarda
Blackletter
Calligraphy
Chancery hand
Court hand (also known as common law hand, Anglicana, cursiva antiquior, or charter hand)
Cursive
Handwriting
History of writing
Italic script
Law hand
Palaeography
Penmanship
Ronde script (calligraphy)
Rotunda (script)
Round hand
Secretary hand

Penmanship
Tudor England
Blackletter
Medieval scripts
Writing
Palaeography